Dvir is a Hebrew given name and surname. Notable people with the name include:

Given name
Dvir Abramovich,  Israeli-Australian Jewish studies academic, columnist, and editor
Dvir Benedek,  Israeli actor
Dvir Sorek, murder victim

Surname
Boaz Dvir,  Israeli-American professor, journalist, and filmmaker
, Israeli explorer and geographer 
 (1931-2018),  Israeli physicist, CEO of Israel Aerospace Industries and Elscint

Fictional characters
 Zohan Dvir, from comedy film You Don't Mess with the Zohan

See also